Verena Marcelle Felicien (born 12 November 1964) is a Saint Lucian former cricketer who played as an all-rounder, batting right-handed and bowling right-arm off break. She appeared in one Test match and 36 One Day Internationals for the West Indies between 1997 and 2005, including playing at the 1997 World Cup in India and the 2005 World Cup in South Africa. She played domestic cricket for Saint Lucia.

Currently an employee of the National Insurance Corporation in Saint Lucia, Felicien started playing in 1982. A member of the club Toughest Wrecking Crew in her community of Ti Rocher, Castries, she led Saint Lucia to regional women's cricket titles from 1998 to 2003, and captained West Indies between 1998 and 2003. She was retained in the side which toured India and Pakistan in 2004, and remained part of the team until 2005. Felicien made scores of 55 and 47 in her sole Test, against Pakistan at Karachi in 2004.

Feleicien was named Saint Lucia's Sportswoman of the Year 1996 and 1998. Up to 2019, she remained active in cricket in Saint Lucia.

Her niece, Patricia Felicien, also played for the West Indies.

References

External links
 
 

1964 births
Living people
Saint Lucian women cricketers
West Indies women One Day International cricketers
West Indies women Test cricketers
West Indian women cricket captains
West Indian women cricketers